Sounds of Love was Bobby Vinton's twenty-first studio album, released in 1970. This album was his third instrumental album and his first in nine years. All the songs on this album feature Vinton on the saxophone rather than vocals.

Track listing

Personnel
Bobby Vinton - vocals
Chuck Cochran - piano
Warren Vincent - sound supervision
Frank Laico - engineer
Stan Weiss - engineer
Peter Basch - front cover photography
Suzanne Szasz - back cover photography

1970 albums
Bobby Vinton albums
Epic Records albums